The Sulphur Spring Range is a mountain range located in east-central Nevada in the United States. The mountains are found mostly in Eureka County northeast of the Roberts Mountains and west of the Diamond Valley and Diamond Mountains. The range crosses into Elko County at the northeastern end.

Sulphur Spring Range was so named on account of sulphur-impregnated mineral springs in the area.

The Bureau of Land Management manages 80.7% of the Sulphur Spring Range, and 19.3% is privately held. Mammals found in the range include: the long-tailed vole, Great Basin pocket mouse, and the deer mouse. The golden eagle and Mojave Desert sidewinder can also be found in the mountains.

Trees found in the range include: Utah juniper (Juniperus osteosperma), and single-leaf pinyon (Pinus monophylla).

Notes

References

Biological Resources Research Center - 
Nevada Atlas & Gazetteer, 2001, pg. 39

Mountain ranges of Nevada
Mountain ranges of Eureka County, Nevada